Schimel is a surname. Notable people with the surname include:

Brad Schimel (born 1965), American prosecutor and judge
David Schimel, NASA research scientist
Lawrence Schimel (born 1971), American science fiction and fantasy writer, translator, and anthologist
Michelle Schimel (born 1957), American politician